Lucas Dias do Nascimento Serafim (born 6 March 1997), commonly known as Lucas Dias, is a Brazilian footballer currently playing as a forward for Lithuanian A Lyga club Riteriai. Besides Brazil, he has played in Bulgaria, Israel, and the Czech Republic.

Career statistics

Club
.

Notes

References

1997 births
Living people
Brazilian footballers
Brazilian expatriate footballers
Association football forwards
Czech First League players
Israeli Premier League players
Czech National Football League players
Associação Atlética de Altos players
Associação Desportiva Confiança players
Bohemians 1905 players
Hapoel Ironi Kiryat Shmona F.C. players
FC Sellier & Bellot Vlašim players
Brazilian expatriate sportspeople in Bulgaria
Expatriate footballers in Bulgaria
Brazilian expatriate sportspeople in the Czech Republic
Expatriate footballers in the Czech Republic
Brazilian expatriate sportspeople in Israel
Expatriate footballers in Israel